Chibly Langlois (born 29 November 1958) is a Haitian cardinal of the Catholic Church. He has served as Bishop of Les Cayes since 15 August 2011, and is also president of Haiti’s Bishops’ Conference.

Pope Francis elevated Langlois to the College of Cardinals on 22 February 2014. As of February 2023, Langlois is the first and only Haitian cardinal in history. He was the only new cardinal elevated in the February 2014 consistory who was not an archbishop.

Biography
Langlois was born in 1958 in La Vallée in southeast Haiti to a poor family. Langlois entered the Grand Séminaire Notre-Dame of Port-au-Prince in 1985, where he studied philosophy and theology. Years later, from 1994 to 1996, he studied at the Pontifical Lateran University in Rome and obtained a licentiate in pastoral theology. 

He was ordained as priest for the diocese of Jacmel on 22 September 1991.

On 8 April 2004 Langlois was appointed bishop of Fort-Liberté by Pope John Paul II. On 15 August 2011 he was appointed bishop of Les Cayes by Pope Benedict XVI.

When choosing to elevate Langlois to the College of Cardinals in 2014, Pope Francis bypassed many more senior Haitian bishops, including metropolitan archbishops Louis Kébreau and Guire Poulard. At the time, Poulard was Langlois's superior in the ecclesiastical province of Port-au-Prince.

On 22 February 2014, Pope Francis appointed Langlois Cardinal-Priest of San Giacomo in Augusta. This Roman church had never before been designated as the titular church of a Catholic cardinal. Cardinal Langlois took possession of his titular church on 7 June 2014.

On 22 May 2014, Pope Francis appointed Cardinal Langlois a member of both the Pontifical Council for Justice and Peace, Pontifical Commission for Latin America, and Secretariat for Communications.

Langlois was injured during the 2021 Haiti earthquake. He was at the bishop's residence when it partially collapsed during the quake. Langlois survived, but a priest and two employees were killed. On June 8, 2022, Langlois was injured in a serious car accident.

See also

Cardinals created by Francis

References

External links

 
LANGLOIS, Chibly 
"Cardinal Chibly Langlois," GCatholic.org

 

|-
 

|-
 

1958 births
Living people
21st-century Roman Catholic bishops in Haiti
Pontifical Lateran University alumni
Cardinals created by Pope Francis
Haitian cardinals
Members of the Secretariat for Communication
Members of the Pontifical Council for Justice and Peace
Members of the Pontifical Commission for Latin America
Haitian Roman Catholic bishops
Roman Catholic bishops of Fort-Liberté
Roman Catholic bishops of Les Cayes